The following is an alphabetical list of subregions in the United Nations geoscheme for Africa, used by the United Nations and maintained by the UNSD department for statistical purposes.

Of the list below, the British Indian Ocean Territory, the French Southern Territories, Mayotte, Réunion, and Saint Helena (Saint Helena, Ascension and Tristan da Cunha) are dependencies or overseas territories of European countries; Western Sahara is a disputed territory.

Northern Africa

Sub-Saharan Africa

Eastern Africa

Middle Africa

Southern Africa

Western Africa

See also 
 List of continents and continental subregions by population
 List of countries by United Nations geoscheme
 List of regions of Africa
 List of sovereign states and dependent territories in Africa
 Regions of the African Union
 United Nations geoscheme
 United Nations geoscheme for the Americas, Asia, Europe, and Oceania
 United Nations Statistics Division

References

External links 
 United Nations Statistics Division – Standard Country and Area Codes Classifications

Regions of Africa
Africa